Lake Erie Beach is a hamlet and census-designated place (CDP) in the town of Evans, Erie County, New York, United States. The population was 3,872 at the 2010 census. It is part of the Buffalo–Niagara Falls Metropolitan Statistical Area.

The community is located southwest of the village of Angola.

Geography
Lake Erie Beach is located at  (42.623658, -79.081635), between NY Route 5 and the Lake Erie shore. It is northeast of Evangola State Park.

Demographics

As of the census of 2000, there were 4,499 people, 1,709 households, and 1,213 families living in the hamlet. The population density was 1,168.7 per square mile (451.2/km2). There were 2,096 housing units at an average density of 544.5/sq mi (210.2/km2). The racial makeup of the community was 97.60% White, 0.20% African American, 0.64% Native American, 0.09% Asian, 0.22% from other races, and 1.24% from two or more races. Hispanic or Latino of any race were 0.93% of the population.

There were 1,709 households, out of which 35.5% had children under the age of 18 living with them, 53.7% were married couples living together, 12.4% had a female householder with no husband present, and 29.0% were non-families. 24.0% of all households were made up of individuals, and 8.0% had someone living alone who was 65 years of age or older. The average household size was 2.63 and the average family size was 3.11.

In the village the population was spread out, with 27.7% under the age of 18, 6.2% from 18 to 24, 31.1% from 25 to 44, 24.6% from 45 to 64, and 10.3% who were 65 years of age or older. The median age was 37 years. For every 100 females, there were 99.2 males. For every 100 females age 18 and over, there were 96.3 males.

The median income for a household in the community was $36,603, and the median income for a family was $39,841. Males had a median income of $35,949 versus $23,974 for females. The per capita income for the CDP was $15,643. About 5.8% of families and 8.1% of the population were below the poverty line, including 11.1% of those under age 18 and 3.1% of those age 65 or over.

References

Hamlets in New York (state)
Census-designated places in New York (state)
Buffalo–Niagara Falls metropolitan area
Census-designated places in Erie County, New York
Hamlets in Erie County, New York